In the early 1800s several ships were named Earl St Vincent for John Jervis, 1st Earl of St Vincent:

  was launched at Gatcombe in 1798. She made one voyage for the  British East India Company (EIC).
  was launched at Yarmouth in 1798. She was last listed in 1846.
  was launched in 1799 as an East Indiaman. She made seven voyages for the EIC before she was sold for breaking up in 1813.
  was a merchant ship built at Topsham, England in 1800. Between 1818 and 1823 she made three voyages transporting convicts from England and Ireland to Australia. She was last listed in 1833.
  was a French ship launched in 1794 that was British captured and that became a British merchantman. Early in her career she was captured by a French privateer, but recaptured. She was last listed in 1814.

See also
 

Ship names